Richard McNamara (born 23 October 1972 in Mytholmroyd, West Riding of Yorkshire, England) is an English musician, singer-songwriter, and producer, best known as the guitarist and co-lead vocalist for the English band Embrace. He and his older brother, Danny, grew up in the village of Bailiff Bridge, Brighouse near Halifax. Danny is the band's lead singer.

Richard and Danny McNamara attended Hipperholme Grammar School in nearby Hipperholme with their brother Jonathan.

According to Danny, as a child Richard was nicknamed 'Firestarter' as he was fascinated with fire and was always playing with a box of matches.

McNamara was initially the drummer for a thrash metal garage band called Gross Misconduct in his teens. It is believed that Embrace began when his brother barged into a session and started telling him and his bandmates what to do.

Although McNamara has worked with his brother in writing many of the band's songs, he only single-handedly sings a few songs. Most notably "One Big Family" and "Hooligan" which were both issued as singles; also "I Want The World" on the band's début album.

In 2018, McNamara (alongside Embrace members, Steve Firth, Mike Heaton and Mickey Dale) collaborated with Preston-based songwriter, Mark Whiteside [Evil Blizzard] under Whiteside’s pre-existing solo project, One Sided Horse. An album [“Between Light and Space”] was recorded and produced by Mickey Dale and released on UK Independent Label, Butterfly Effect.

Production discography

References

External links

1972 births
Living people
English rock guitarists
English male guitarists
English songwriters
English male singers
People from Mytholmroyd
People from Brighouse
People educated at Hipperholme Grammar School
21st-century English singers
21st-century British guitarists
21st-century British male singers
British male songwriters